Consort Shi may refer to:

Xi Shi ( 5th century BC), (possibly fictional) consort of Fuchai of Wu
Empress Shi ( 23), wife of Wang Mang (only emperor of Xin)
Princess Shi ( 380s), wife of Lü Guang (Emperor Yiwu of Later Liang)
Queen Dowager Shi (died  920), concubine of Yang Xingmi